Marsden Manson (1850–1931) was a civil engineer.

Manson was born in Virginia on February 14, 1850, and died in Berkeley, California, on February 21, 1931. He got a bachelor of science and civil engineering degrees in 1873 at the Virginia Military Institute and received his Ph.D. in engineering at University of California on 1893.

Manson worked as a civil engineer for several institutions in California, in particular in the San Francisco area.

Books and publications
 "The Evolution of Climate", 1922

References

External links

 

1850 births
1931 deaths
American civil engineers
Virginia Military Institute alumni
University of California, Berkeley alumni